Harvard station is a transit station in Cambridge, Massachusetts.

Harvard station may also refer to:
 Harvard station (CTA), a former Chicago 'L' station in Englewood, Chicago, Illinois
 Harvard station (Metra), a Metra station in Harvard, Illinois

See also
Harvard (disambiguation)